Charles Allwright (1902– 10 August 1978) was a male English international table tennis player.

He won a bronze medal at the 1926 World Table Tennis Championships in the men's team event.

Allwright also played cricket in the early 1920s, winning the 1922/23 London League Championship

See also
 List of World Table Tennis Championships medalists
 List of England players at the World Team Table Tennis Championships

References

1902 births
1978 deaths
World Table Tennis Championships medalists
English male table tennis players